George W. Lowther (1822 - 1898) was a barber, state representative, and civil rights activist. He served in the Massachusetts House of Representatives. The State Library of Massachusetts has a photograph of him. A Republican, he served in the state house in 1878 and 1879. He was involved in the temperance movement.

See also
 1878 Massachusetts legislature
1879 Massachusetts legislature
African-American officeholders during and following the Reconstruction era

References

American civil rights activists
1822 births
1898 deaths
Barbers